The 1993–94 Libyan Premier League was the 26th edition of the competition since its inception in 1963. Ahly Tripoli won their 7th league title by beating arch rivals Ittihad 1–0 in the Championship Playoff. The title was Ahly's first for ten seasons.

Overview
The 21 participating teams were split into two groups, one of 11 teams, and the other of 10. The top team in each group would go through to a one-off match to decide the championship.

Ittihad won their group by 12 points from Hilal, while Ahly Tripoli won their group by 6 points from cross-city rivals Madina.

The championship match took place on June 14, 1994, at the 11 June Stadium. Ahly Tripoli defeated Ittihad 1–0 to achieve the national crown.

League standings

Group A

Group B

Playoff
The top team from each group advanced to a one-off playoff match, to be played at the 11 June Stadium. Ahly Tripoli defeated bitter rivals Ittihad through an Idris Mikraaz goal to win their 8th Premier League title.

References

Libya - List of final tables (RSSSF)

Libyan Premier League seasons
1
Libya